The 1991–92 Ohio State Buckeyes men's basketball team represented Ohio State University as a member of the Big Ten Conference during the 1991–92 NCAA men's college basketball season.

Roster

Schedule and results

|-
!colspan=9 style=| Non-conference regular season

|-
!colspan=9 style=| Big Ten Regular season

|-
!colspan=9 style=| NCAA tournament

NCAA basketball tournament
Southeast 
Ohio State 83, Mississippi Valley 56
Ohio State 78, Connecticut 55
Ohio State 80, North Carolina 73
Michigan 75, Ohio State 71

Rankings

Awards and honors
 Jim Jackson, Chicago Tribune Silver Basketball, Consensus First-team All-American

Team players drafted into the NBA

References

External links
1991-92 OHIO STATE BASKETBALL STATISTICS at Ohiostatebuckeyes.com
1991-92 Ohio State Buckeyes Roster and Stats at Sports-Reference.com
Ohio State Men's Basketball 2019-20 Guide, pp. 166–188.

Ohio State Buckeyes men's basketball seasons
Ohio State Buckeyes
Ohio State
Ohio State Buckeyes
Ohio State Buckeyes